The 1904–05 Butler Bulldogs men's basketball team represents Butler University during the 1904–05 college men's basketball season. The head coach was Edgar Wingard, coaching in his first season with the Bulldogs.

Schedule

|-

References

Butler Bulldogs men's basketball seasons
Butler
Butl
Butl